Star Wars: Galactic Starcruiser''' is a Star Wars-themed 2-night live-action/role-playing choose your own adventure experience aboard a simulated cruise in outer space within the Star Wars galaxy. With an opening date of March 1, 2022, Starcruiser guests begin their experience at the terminal located adjacent to Disney's Hollywood Studios, in the Epcot Resort Area of the Walt Disney World Resort in Bay Lake, Florida. The hotel accompanies the Star Wars: Galaxy's Edge themed area in Disney's Hollywood Studios.

 History 
In April 2017, Disney contracted the website Swagbucks to survey visitors in order to gauge interest in a possible Star Wars-themed hotel. As a result of the survey, Disney decided to approve such a hotel, with a visitor experience based on the Star Wars storyline.

Definite plans for the Star Wars hotel were first announced at D23 Expo 2017 in Anaheim, California. The proposal was announced as part of the unveiling of 23 improvements and additions to Disney parks around the world.

At D23 Expo 2019, it was revealed that the hotel would be called the Halcyon and would be a two-night immersive experience where all guests arrive and depart together, similar to a cruise line.

 Description 
The Star Wars hotel was originally scheduled to open in 2021 according to the Orlando Sentinel, but opened on March 1, 2022 due to delays from the COVID-19 pandemic. Early renderings of the project showed that the new hotel would be shaped like a Star Wars starship. The rooms contain full size bunk beds, a queen size bed and in some rooms a pull down to sleep a fifth guest in the style of Star Wars bunkers, with each room fitting four to five people. Renderings also showed a lobby in the style of a Star Wars spaceship interior.

On May 30, 2018, it was announced that the hotel would be located just south of Disney's Hollywood Studios, to the east of World Drive. The hotel's direct entrance to Disney's Hollywood Studios is located between the Millennium Falcon: Smugglers Run attraction and the First Order ship at Docking Bay 9 in Star Wars: Galaxy's Edge, though this entrance is for Starcruiser passengers only. Valet parking is available for guests arriving in personal vehicles, with no self parking options are offered, or guests can use other means, such as ride sharing or a taxi. A driveway connects the Starcruiser's main terminal to the Cast parking lot of Disney's Hollywood Studios.

Bob Chapek, Chairman of Walt Disney Parks & Resorts, stated that the Star Wars hotel would be Disney's "most experiential concept ever" when it opens. Chapek described the hotel as a "100% immersive" experience that "will culminate in a unique journey for every person who visits.” Some examples of the planned features included creatures and droids acting as certain hotel staff; guests wearing Star Wars costumes; and an ability to interact with features of the hotel as if visitors were really in the Star Wars universe. Visitors would also be able to have lightsaber training and duels (an extension of the Jedi Training Academy in Disney's Hollywood Studios); explore and pilot Star Wars spacecraft; and go on "secret missions" personalized toward the visitors' experience. Currently, these concepts turned into droids participating as crew members, and lightsaber training solely on the ship for Passengers. Instead of piloting the ship, Passengers are able to partake in "Bridge Ops" training.

One writer for The Verge called the planned hotel a "Westworld for Star Wars fans," noting the different hotel amenities that would allow the immersive-hotel experience to occur. Mic compared the planned hotel to Disney's Animal Kingdom Lodge and Universal Orlando's Cabana Bay Beach Resort, both of which are existing hotels containing immersive experiences, though to a lesser extent.

Guests at the hotel travel directly to Star Wars: Galaxy's Edge by a shuttle-pod transportation system. This system is made so the interior resembles a shuttle spacecraft that ferries guests between the hotel and the land while maintaining the illusion of traveling from space to the planet's surface and back.

Reception

Critical reception of Galactic Starcruiser focused on the value it provided for its very high prices. Early photos of the Halcyons small, windowless cabins went viral before the experience opened to the public, with many commentators on Twitter complaining that they were not suitable luxury accommodation. CNBC reported that the price, about $1,200 per person per day, was "steep," but that the experience was worth the cost as long as guests were willing to actively engage with many of the activities on board, with very little downtime. Polygon regarded Galactic Starcruiser as a form of participatory entertainment, requiring guests to put in a significant amount of effort to see and do everything they want during their brief stay, without spending much time in their cabin other than to sleep. "If you love Star Wars and want to commit to this experience in full by wearing costumes and interacting with characters and living your best Star Wars life, you’ll enjoy yourself," wrote a reviewer for Nerdist''.

References

External links

 

Hotel
Star Wars
Hotel buildings completed in 2022
2022 establishments in Florida
Hotels established in 2022